Stolovi (Serbian Cyrillic: Столови) is a mountain in central Serbia, near the city of Kraljevo. Its highest peak Usovica has an elevation of 1,356 meters above sea level.

References

Mountains of Serbia